The 1998 World Ringette Championships (1998 WRC) was an international ringette tournament initially meant to be the 5th (X) World Ringette Championships and was originally scheduled to be hosted in Moncton, New Brunswick, Canada.. However, a promotional five-game ringette "Summit Series" tour of Europe was organized instead with a series of games between Team Canada, and Team Finland between February 27 and March 7, 1998. Officially dubbed the "1998 Summit Series / EuroTour", the games were contested in Finland, Sweden, Germany, and France. The event was organized by the International Ringette Federation (IRF). The 5th World Ringette Championships took place the following year at the 2000 World Ringette Championships.

1998 Summit Series 
The 1998 Summit Series for international ringette was a European tour organized exclusively for the national ringette teams of Canada and Finland. It replaced the 1998 World Ringette Championship which was initially planned to be played in Moncton, New Brunswick, Canada. Both teams made stops in four different countries and cities: Turku (Finland), Gothenburg (Sweden), Osnabruck (Germany), and Colmar (France).

The fifth and final game took place in Colmar, France, where Team Finland beat Team Canada 10–8. Team Finland won the Summit Series against Canada 3–2.

Venues

Venues were in Germany, Sweden, Finland, and France.

Teams

Games

Final results

Rosters

Team Finland
The 1998 Team Finland team included the following:

Team Canada
Initially, the 1998 World Ringette Championships were to be held in Moncton, New Brunswick, Canada, but a promotional five-game ringette tour of Europe, "1998 Summit Series / EuroTour", was organized with competitions between Team Canada and Team Finland instead.
 1998 Team Canada included, "athlete representation from each province and the Northwest Territories".

The 1998 Team Canada team included the following:

See also
  Canada national ringette team
  Finland national ringette team

References

World Ringette Championships
Ringette
Ringette competitions